Daiji Takahashi (born March 9, 1977) is a Japanese mixed martial artist. He competed in the Flyweight and Bantamweight division.

Mixed martial arts record

|-
| Loss
| align=center| 8-11-4
| Shinichi Hanawa
| KO (punches)
| Shooto: Shooting Disco 16: Regeneration
| 
| align=center| 2
| align=center| 2:10
| Tokyo, Japan
| 
|-
| Win
| align=center| 8-10-4
| Yusei Shimokawa
| Decision (unanimous)
| Shooto: Gig Tokyo 5
| 
| align=center| 3
| align=center| 5:00
| Tokyo, Japan
| 
|-
| Win
| align=center| 7-10-4
| Takuya Mori
| Decision (majority)
| Shooto: Gig North 4
| 
| align=center| 3
| align=center| 5:00
| Sapporo, Hokkaido, Japan
| 
|-
| Draw
| align=center| 6-10-4
| Masaaki Sugawara
| Draw
| Shooto: Shooto Tradition 6
| 
| align=center| 3
| align=center| 5:00
| Tokyo, Japan
| 
|-
| Draw
| align=center| 6-10-3
| Seiji Ozuka
| Draw
| Shooto: Shooting Disco 6: Glory Shines In You
| 
| align=center| 2
| align=center| 5:00
| Tokyo, Japan
| 
|-
| Loss
| align=center| 6-10-2
| Yasuhiro Urushitani
| Decision (unanimous)
| Shooto 2006: 9/8 in Korakuen Hall
| 
| align=center| 3
| align=center| 5:00
| Tokyo, Japan
| 
|-
| Loss
| align=center| 6-9-2
| Junji Ikoma
| Submission (triangle choke)
| Shooto: 3/24 in Korakuen Hall
| 
| align=center| 3
| align=center| 3:50
| Tokyo, Japan
| 
|-
| Loss
| align=center| 6-8-2
| Mamoru Yamaguchi
| Decision (unanimous)
| Shooto: 12/17 in Shinjuku FACE
| 
| align=center| 3
| align=center| 5:00
| Tokyo, Japan
| 
|-
| Loss
| align=center| 6-7-2
| Shinichi Kojima
| Decision (unanimous)
| Shooto: 1/29 in Korakuen Hall
| 
| align=center| 2
| align=center| 5:00
| Tokyo, Japan
| 
|-
| Win
| align=center| 6-6-2
| Hiroyasu Kodera
| Decision (unanimous)
| Shooto: Wanna Shooto 2004
| 
| align=center| 2
| align=center| 5:00
| Tokyo, Japan
| 
|-
| Win
| align=center| 5-6-2
| Tomohiro Hashi
| Decision (unanimous)
| Shooto: 3/4 in Kitazawa Town Hall
| 
| align=center| 2
| align=center| 5:00
| Setagaya, Tokyo, Japan
| 
|-
| Loss
| align=center| 4-6-2
| Masatoshi Abe
| Decision (unanimous)
| Shooto: 8/10 in Yokohama Cultural Gymnasium
| 
| align=center| 2
| align=center| 5:00
| Yokohama, Kanagawa, Japan
| 
|-
| Win
| align=center| 4-5-2
| Toshiteru Ishii
| Decision (unanimous)
| Shooto: 2/6 in Kitazawa Town Hall
| 
| align=center| 2
| align=center| 5:00
| Setagaya, Tokyo, Japan
| 
|-
| Loss
| align=center| 3-5-2
| Shooto: Treasure Hunt 8
| Decision (unanimous)
| Masato Shiozawa
| 
| align=center| 2
| align=center| 5:00
| Tokyo, Japan
| 
|-
| Loss
| align=center| 3-4-2
| Ryota Matsune
| Decision (unanimous)
| Shooto: Treasure Hunt 1
| 
| align=center| 2
| align=center| 5:00
| Tokyo, Japan
| 
|-
| Loss
| align=center| 3-3-2
| Ryota Matsune
| Decision (majority)
| Shooto: Gig East 6
| 
| align=center| 2
| align=center| 5:00
| Tokyo, Japan
| 
|-
| Win
| align=center| 3-2-2
| Hiroshi Umemura
| Submission (rear-naked choke)
| Shooto: Gig East 2
| 
| align=center| 2
| align=center| 3:51
| Tokyo, Japan
| 
|-
| Loss
| align=center| 2-2-2
| Kentaro Imaizumi
| Decision (unanimous)
| Shooto: Wanna Shooto 2001
| 
| align=center| 2
| align=center| 5:00
| Setagaya, Tokyo, Japan
| 
|-
| Win
| align=center| 2-1-2
| Yasuhiro Urushitani
| Decision (unanimous)
| Shooto: To The Top 1
| 
| align=center| 2
| align=center| 5:00
| Tokyo, Japan
| 
|-
| Draw
| align=center| 1-1-2
| Hiroki Kita
| Draw
| Shooto: R.E.A.D. 11
| 
| align=center| 2
| align=center| 5:00
| Setagaya, Tokyo, Japan
| 
|-
| Win
| align=center| 1-1-1
| Takeyasu Hirono
| Decision (majority)
| Shooto: R.E.A.D. 7
| 
| align=center| 2
| align=center| 5:00
| Setagaya, Tokyo, Japan
| 
|-
| Loss
| align=center| 0-1-1
| Hiroaki Yoshioka
| Decision (split)
| Shooto: R.E.A.D. 4
| 
| align=center| 2
| align=center| 5:00
| Setagaya, Tokyo, Japan
| 
|-
| Draw
| align=center| 0-0-1
| Masaki Nishizawa
| Draw
| Shooto: Gateway to the Extremes
| 
| align=center| 2
| align=center| 5:00
| Setagaya, Tokyo, Japan
|

See also
List of male mixed martial artists

References

External links
 

1977 births
Japanese male mixed martial artists
Flyweight mixed martial artists
Bantamweight mixed martial artists
Living people